Clarence Smith (11 March 1902 – 9 January 1982) was a South African cricketer. He played in sixteen first-class matches for Eastern Province between 1934/35 and 1939/40.

See also
 List of Eastern Province representative cricketers

References

External links
 

1902 births
1982 deaths
South African cricketers
Eastern Province cricketers